Mechelen may refer to:

In Flanders, Belgium
Mechelen, a city in Antwerp province
Archbishopric of Mechelen-Brussels, an Ecclesiastical Province; the Roman Catholic Primatial See in Belgium
K.V. Mechelen, a football club
Lordship of Mechelen, and independent Lordship within Habsburg-controlled Low Countries (until 1795); one of the original Seventeen Provinces
Mechelen transit camp, a detention and deportation camp operating during the Nazi occupation
Maasmechelen, a municipality in the province of Limburg
Mechelen-aan-de-Maas, a village within the municipality of Maasmechelen
Mechelen incident, a pre-World War II incident (January 1940) whereby a German bomber made a forced landing in Belgium
Mechelen-Bovelingen, a village in the municipality of Heers, in the province of Limburg
Kwaadmechelen, a village in the municipality of Ham, in the province of Limburg

In the Netherlands
Mechelen, Netherlands, a village in the municipality of Gulpen-Wittem, in the province of Limburg

See also
Machelen
Machelen, Zulte
Michelin
Mechlin (disambiguation)